Christus is an 1833 white Carrara marble statue of the resurrected Jesus Christ by Bertel Thorvaldsen located in the Church of Our Lady (Evangelical Lutheran Church of Denmark) in Copenhagen, Denmark.  It was commissioned as part of a larger group, which includes 11 of the original 12 apostles and Paul the Apostle (instead of Judas Iscariot). It has been widely reproduced.  Images and replicas of the statue were adopted by the leaders of the Church of Jesus Christ of Latter-day Saints (LDS Church) in the 20th century to emphasize the centrality of Jesus Christ in its teachings.

Original sculpture
The Church of Our Lady was destroyed by fire in September 1807 from bombardment by the British Royal Navy during the Battle of Copenhagen (1807) which was part of the Napoleonic Wars. When the church was being rebuilt, Thorvaldsen was commissioned in 1819 to sculpt statues of Jesus Christ and the apostles; a baptismal font; other furnishings; and decorative elements. A plaster cast model was supplied for the church's consecration on June 7, 1829, with the finished white Carrara marble statue replacing it in November 1833. The inscription at the base of the sculpture reads "Kommer til mig" ("Come unto me") with a reference to the Bible verse Matthew 11:28. Jesus Christ is depicted with His hands spread, displaying the wounds in the hands of His resurrected body. The original plaster cast model is on display in the Thorvaldsen Museum in Copenhagen, Denmark.

Replicas
Churches
 In the Wawel Cathedral in Kraków, Poland (1833; mounted in 1835)
 In the St. Petri Church (Church of Norway) in Stavanger, Norway (1853)
 In the Koranda Congregation Chapel (Evangelical Church of Czech Brethren) in Pilsen, Czech Republic
 In the Church Of Transfiguration of The Lord (Old Catholic Church of the Czech Republic) in Varnsdorf, Czech Republic 
 In the St. John United Lutheran Church (1926; originally a Danish speaking congregation) in the Phinney Ridge neighborhood of Seattle, Washington, US
 In the St. Paul's United Methodist Church in Houston, Texas, US
 In the Trinity Lutheran Church in Galesburg, Illinois, USA (wood carved by Meyer in Oberammergau, Germany)
 In the Onsta Gryta Church (Church of Sweden) in Västerås, Sweden (2009; 6-foot tall; 30,000 white Lego pieces)
 In front of the Church of Peace (Protestant) in Potsdam, Germany (1845-1854)
 In front of the Cathedral Church of the Advent (Episcopal) in Birmingham, Alabama, US
Cemeteries
 In the Oakwood Cemetery in Huntsville, Texas, US (bronze)
 In the Forest Lawn Memorial Park in Glendale, California, US (1947; The Court of the Christus on Cathedral Drive)
 In the Forest Lawn Cypress cemetery in Cypress, California, US (1959; The Garden of Faith on Sunset Drive)
 In the Forest Lawn Hollywood Hills cemetery in Hollywood Hills, California, US (The Court of Remembrance)
 In the Forest Lawn Covina Hills cemetery in Covina Hills, California, US
 In the Luisenfriedhof I Cemetery in Berlin, Germany (bronze)
 In the Luisenfriedhof III cemetery in Berlin, Germany
 In the Haggenmacher family tomb at the Farkasréti Cemetery in Budapest, Hungary (1919)
Hospital
 In the Johns Hopkins Hospital in Baltimore, Maryland, US (1896; Christus Consolator)

LDS Church use
Stephen L Richards, an apostle and First Counselor to church president David O. McKay in the First Presidency, purchased a replica of the Christus the late 1950s and gifted it to the church. It was completed by the Rebechi Aldo & Gualtiero studio from white Carrara marble in Pietrasanta, Tuscany, Italy in April 1959; arrived in Salt Lake City, Utah in June 1959; was placed in the unfinished North Visitors' Center on Temple Square in Salt Lake City in 1962; and was unveiled in 1967. In preparation for the demolition of the North Visitors’ Center, the replica was removed in November 2021 and placed in storage for conservation. Its final home has not yet been disclosed. In December 2019, another replica (8-foot-tall) was placed across the street in the Conference Center.

A second Christus replica was sculpted by the Rebechi Aldo & Gualtiero studio in to be displayed in the LDS Pavilion at the 1964 New York World's Fair. Its display "was intended to help visitors understand that Latter-day Saints are Christians". After the World's Fair ended on October 17, 1965, the replica was shipped from New York to the Los Angeles California Temple visitors' center on November 21, 1966.

The church commissioned the Rebechi Aldo & Gualtiero studio to sculpt a third replica of the Christus statue for the Japan World Exposition (Expo ‘70) in Osaka, Japan.  It was 9’6”-tall and weighed 10,000-11,000 pounds.  After the Expo ended on September 13, 1970, it was stored in a Japanese warehouse for 6 years. It was then shipped from Japan to New Zealand in March 1977.  The renovated Hamilton New Zealand Temple visitors' center reopened with it inside on August 4, 1977.

Since then, the church has created replicas of the statue and displayed them in temple visitors' centers in Laie, Hawaii; Mexico City, Mexico; Washington, D.C.; Oakland, California; St. George, Utah; Idaho Falls, Idaho; Nauvoo, Illinois;  Palmyra, New York; London, England; Portland, Oregon; Paris, France; São Paulo, Brazil; Provo, Utah; and Rome, Italy (accompanied by replicas of Thorvaldsen's twelve apostles). 

Replicas are also displayed in the visitors' centers in Nauvoo, Illinois, the Hill Cumorah in Palmyra, New York, and Independence, Missouri.  Other replicas are displayed in the church's meetinghouses in Hyde Park (neighborhood in London, England); Garðabær (suburb south of Reykjavik), Iceland (2000); and Copenhagen, Denmark.

On April 4, 2020, church president Russell M. Nelson announced a new symbol for the church, featuring an image of the Christus as the central element, placed above the church's name.  The church uses the image on its webpages and in other official publications.

Image gallery

See also
 List of statues of Jesus

Notes

External links 
 

Sculptures by Bertel Thorvaldsen
Sculptures in Copenhagen
Marble sculptures in Copenhagen
Plaster sculptures in Denmark
Sculptures of the Thorvaldsen Museum
Statues of Jesus
Christian symbols